Dragons of Glory is a Dungeons & Dragons source book in a series of modules from the Dragonlance campaign setting.  It is one of the 16 DL modules published by TSR between 1984 and 1986.

This module is "a complete and self-contained simulation game" centered on the War of the Lance. While other modules focus on the journeys of characters such as Tanis Half-Elven, this module allows the dungeon master (DM) to recreate larger battles. Characters can control the forces of the High Solamnic Knights or their enemies, the Dragon Highlords. The module can be played with the Battlesystem rules, but is designed to be run as a standalone wargame. Advanced rules are available in Dragon Magazine #107.

Contents
The Dragons of Glory pack consists of: a stiff, double cardboard cover with tables and text on the inside for use during the game, a large two-sectioned map covering the continent of Ansalon and surrounding islands, 400 die-cut counters with a resealable plastic bag in which to store them, an eight-page rule book, and a 16-page campaign and scenario book.

Dragons of Glory is a self-contained wargame based on the Dragonlance series of books published by TSR.  The evil Dragon Highlords are trying to conquer the world of Krynn, and the Whitestone forces must stop them.  There are many neutral countries that both sides may recruit, thus increasing the size of their armies. There are also magic items, wizards, dragons, and leaders, all of which can affect combat.  The combat results table is based on a ten-sided die instead of the standard six-sided, and there are many die roll modifiers.  The table has a range of -5 to 16 for the die roll.

Plot summary
Dragons of Glory is both a sourcebook and a strategic-level war based board-game. The game is set during a war between two factions: the draconians and the defenders of Krynn. The set describes the war and the opposing armies, using Battlesystem statistics for both sides.

Dragons of Glory is a simulation game, designed to allow players to produce their own historical timeline of the events in the world of Krynn for an ongoing Dragonlance campaign. By keeping a record of forces' positions over time, news can be related to the player characters, who can encounter various armies, creatures, or leaders at appropriate points.

Publication history
DL11 Dragons of Glory was written by Douglas Niles and Tracy Hickman, with cover art by Jeff Easley and interior illustrations by Diana Magnuson and Jeff Butler. It was published by TSR in 1986 as a sixteen-page pamphlet, an eight-page pamphlet, two large color maps, a cardboard counter sheet, a small zip-locked bag, and a double-thick outer folder.

Niles and Hickman revealed in Dragon No. 107 (March 1986) that in the product, some details affecting combat were dispensed with for ease of play. The article in Dragon provided advanced and optional rules for the Dragons of Glory simulation game, some of which complement the standard rules, while others replace some of them. Three new scenarios were also included in the article.

Reception
Graham Staplehurst reviewed Dragons of Glory for White Dwarf No. 78. He stated that the game "isn't brilliant", calling the rulebook "rather unhelpful", and feeling that TSR (having purchased SPI) "could have put this together rather better". He felt that the explanation for the counters was poor, noting the absence of a key to identify which color represented which nation. He also noted that the game required multiple types of dice, making game mechanics unnecessarily messy. He considered the rules "very simple", saying that: "anyone who has played a simulation game before should find them easy in the extreme to pick up, though there are unclear points, which is again unnecessary in a game this simple", citing the example rules of retreating before combat and the "moving capital" rule. He noted that with the latter rule all a player is required to do to win an offered scenario is to "disband" their capital. Staplehurst felt that although the retreating rule was a sensible option, it left the potential responses available for the attacker unclear. He  said that the game "didn't appeal to me as a simulation gamer", and that compared with "excellent fantasy games" such as White Bear and Red Moon and SPI's War of the Ring, Dragons of Glory seemed "to have been rather hastily put together and the rules and charts could have been much better organized". Staplehurst also believed that while the option of using the simulation to provide a unique historical background and context for a Dragonlance campaign sounded fine, this would require a large amount of bookkeeping and a very dedicated DM to manage. He also opined that with ten modules already released in the series, most players had already started their campaigns. He concluded His review by stating, "Overall, I hesitate to recommend this game to anyone but the Dragonlance fanatic who has had some experience of simulation games. It's not a very good introduction for the novice[...] and is not a particularly enjoyable [sic] to the shelves of a simulation wargamer."

Doug Traversa reviewed the adventure in Space Gamer/Fantasy Gamer No. 80. He notes that "Despite its module format, this is not another AD&D adventure, but a separate self-contained wargame". Traversa commented that "On first inspection, the game appears to be a real winner.  The counters are beautiful, the maps are done in water color, which gives them an aged appearance.  The rules are easy to read, and many of the mechanics are right out of TSR's old Divine Right game." After noting the lower-than-usual price, he commented that "Unfortunately, the old adage, 'You get what you pay for', seems to apply here.  The rules are shoddy, full of unanswered questions, and the scenario booklet if full of errors.  After playing one basic scenario and two campaign games, we came up with over twenty serious rules omissions and found several errors in the set-up instructions for scenario 2." Traversa concluded his review by saying "In a short review it would not be desirable to list all the problems with this game; but rest assured, there are enough to give players a real headache.  I sent a list of our questions to TSR, and until I get a reply, Dragons of Glory will sit on my shelf.  Playing it is not worth the effort.  Until a comprehensive errata sheet comes out, avoid this game.  If one does come out, Dragons of Glory could go from being the dog of the year to being a very enjoyable game."

References

Dragonlance adventures
Role-playing game supplements introduced in 1986